The Fowler Company Building is a historic building located in Waterloo, Iowa, United States.  It was built in 1884 by the city's most successful grocery wholesale business.  They continued to operate from here until 1937.  The three-story brick structure is an example of Late Victorian commercial architecture with Queen Anne influences.  The building features pilasters, corbeling, canted-brick courses, and contrasting stone trim around and between the windows and at the street level. It is capped with an ornate metal cornice that contains pilasters, finials, pediments, floral and circle imagery, and quilted surface textures.  It was individually listed on the National Register of Historic Places in 2009. In 2011 it was included as a contributing property in the Waterloo East Commercial Historic District.

References

Commercial buildings completed in 1884
Buildings and structures in Waterloo, Iowa
National Register of Historic Places in Black Hawk County, Iowa
Commercial buildings on the National Register of Historic Places in Iowa
Victorian architecture in Iowa
Individually listed contributing properties to historic districts on the National Register in Iowa